Ingvild Vaggen Malvik (born 3 April 1971 in Trondheim) is a Norwegian politician for the Socialist Left Party (SV). She was elected to the Norwegian Parliament from Sør-Trøndelag in 2001. She failed to get re-elected in 2005, but meets in the place of Øystein Djupedal, who was appointed to a government position.

Parliamentary Presidium duties 
2001–2005 secretary in the Lagting.

Parliamentary Committee duties 
2005–2009 member of the Standing Committee on Business and Industry.
2001–2005 member of the Standing Committee on Energy and the Environment.
2001–2005 deputy member of the Electoral Committee.

External links

1971 births
Living people
Socialist Left Party (Norway) politicians
Members of the Storting
Women members of the Storting
21st-century Norwegian politicians
21st-century Norwegian women politicians